Troy Edwards (born January 21, 1964 in Coral Gables, Florida) is a retired U.S. soccer defender who played professionally in several U.S. leagues including one season in Major League Soccer.  He was a member of two college championship teams and one runner up and in 1989 scored the winning goal in the Fort Lauderdale Strikers national championship victory over the San Diego Nomads.

Player

High school and college
Edwards grew up in Miami, Florida.  He played soccer at Miami Killian High School where he was an All-Dade County player.  In 1982, he entered Miami-Dade Community College, playing on the men's soccer team in 1982 and 1983.  In 1983, the Miami-Dade won the National Junior College National Championship, defeating Forest Park Community College.  He then transferred to Florida International University for the 1984 and 1985 seasons.  FIU won the 1984 NCAA Division II Soccer Championship over Seattle Pacific University with Edwards scoring a golden goal in overtime, and were runners-up in 1985.

Professional
It appears he began his professional career in 1988 when he signed with the Miami Sharks of the newly established American Soccer League.  That season, he was a first team All Star.  The next season, he joined the Fort Lauderdale Strikers.  That year, the Strikers won the ASL title, putting them in the first national championship game played since the demise of the North American Soccer League in 1984.  The Strikers met the San Diego Nomads of the Western Soccer League, coming from behind to win 3-1 with Edwards scoring the winning Strikers goal.  He played for the Strikers through the 1993 season.  In addition to playing the summer outdoor season with the Strikers, Edwards played in 2 indoor winter seasons, 1991–1993, with the Rockford Thunder & Canton Invaders in the National Professional Soccer League.

In 1994, he played for the Carolina Vipers in the Continental Indoor Soccer League, then spent the 1995 season with the Myrtle Beach Boyz in the USISL where he was named Defender of the Year for the league.  On February 6, 1996, the Colorado Rapids selected Edwards in the fifth round (forty-second overall) in the 1996 MLS Inaugural Player Draft.  Member of US National team pool 1990-1995. He played only four games for the Rapids, suffering an upper thigh injury and having groin surgery.  He retired from playing professionally at the end of the season.

Coach
In 1996, Edwards became an assistant coach at Barry University, a position he held until 2001. In that time Barry played in 3 NCAA tournaments finishing 2nd (runner up) in 2000.  He also served as a physical education teacher and the athletic director of Holy Family Catholic School in North Miami, Florida. Troy holds a USSF B License and Youth National coaching badges. Director of coaching North Port Fusion FC 2012-2019.

References

1964 births
Living people
American soccer coaches
American soccer players
American Professional Soccer League players
American Soccer League (1988–89) players
Canton Invaders players
Carolina Vipers players
Colorado Rapids players
Continental Indoor Soccer League players
FIU Panthers men's soccer players
Fort Lauderdale Strikers (1988–1994) players
Association football defenders
Miami Freedom players
Myrtle Beach Boyz players
National Professional Soccer League (1984–2001) players
USISL players